Aberlour railway station served the village of Aberlour in Scotland from 1863 to 1965.

History

Both the Strathspey and Morayshire railways were absorbed into the Great North of Scotland Railway in 1866 and 1881 respectively.

The station was host to a LNER camping coach from 1937 to 1939. A coach was also positioned here by Scottish Region of British Railways from 1954 to 1955.

The station closed to passengers on 18 October 1965 but the line was still open to freight until 15 November 1971.

The site today

The site is now home to the Speyside Way Visitor Centre. The building has been enlarged and the old railway buildings are now a teashop.

References

Further reading

External links
Station on navigable O. S. map
 Pictures of the station on Railscot 
 Strathspey Railway on Railscot 

Disused railway stations in Moray
Railway stations in Great Britain opened in 1863
Railway stations in Great Britain closed in 1965
Beeching closures in Scotland
Former Great North of Scotland Railway stations
1863 establishments in Scotland
1965 disestablishments in Scotland